Frederik "Fric" Detiček (born 27 January 1943, in Kranj) is a Slovenian former alpine skier who competed for Yugoslavia in the 1964 Winter Olympics. He participated in the Men's Downhill, Men's Giant Slalom, and Men's Slalom events.

References

External links
 

1943 births
Living people
Slovenian male alpine skiers
Olympic alpine skiers of Yugoslavia
Alpine skiers at the 1964 Winter Olympics
Sportspeople from Kranj